Giovanni Antonio Greccolini, also known as Gregolini (16 January 1675–1756) was an Italian painter of the Rococo period.

He was initially a pupil of Giovanni Battista Lenardi, but after the master's death, he worked in the studio of Benedetto Luti in Rome.

References

1675 births
1756 deaths
17th-century Italian painters
Italian male painters
18th-century Italian painters
Rococo painters
18th-century Italian male artists